Roscoe "Ross" Challis Carter (March 10, 1914 – June 19, 2002) was an American football player who played defensive end.

He played college football at the University of Oregon. He was drafted in the eighth round of the 1936 NFL Draft. He played for the Chicago Cardinals from 1936 to 1939.

External links
 http://goliath.ecnext.com/coms2/summary_0199-1781140_ITM

1914 births
2002 deaths
People from Republic, Missouri
American football offensive linemen
Oregon Ducks football players
Chicago Cardinals players